Royal Air Force Bodney or more simply RAF Bodney is a former Royal Air Force Station located  west of Watton, Norfolk, England.

Originally built as an RAF Bomber Command airfield during 1939-1940, Bodney was transferred to the United States Army Air Forces in the summer of 1943. Placed under the jurisdiction of VIII Fighter Command of Eighth Air Force, it was primarily the home of the 352d Fighter Group, the "Blue Nosed Bastards of Bodney".  The unit briefly moved to Belgium in January 1945 due to the Battle of the Bulge, although it returned in April. It was closed after the 352d returned to the United States in November.

History

Royal Air Force use
Initially it was used by aircraft of No. 21 Squadron RAF and No. 82 Squadron RAF (No. 2 Group) Bomber Command. They carried operations over France and later the Netherlands and even Norway. Their Bristol Blenheim IVs were joined on occasions by, in May 1941, 90 Squadron evaluating its new Boeing Fortress Mk 1s some Handley Page Hampdens for mining operations. 90 Squadron suffered heavy casualties and the use of the Fortress I was discontinued. Towards October 1942, the Blenheims were changed to Lockheed Venturas but the squadron moved on to RAF Methwold before the Venturas were operational. Relief Landing Ground for No. 17 (Pilots) Advanced Flying Unit RAF between January 1942 and May 1943.

United States Army Air Forces use

Lt. Lincoln Delmar Bundy, a North American P-51 Mustang fighter pilot flying from here, was shot down over occupied France on 10 June 1944. Eluding capture, he joined a mixed group of French resistance fighters and British soldiers in the SAS. Their mission, known as Operation Bulbasket, was sabotage of SS units coming north to oppose the Normandy invasion. The group was ultimately captured, and Bundy, along with the others, was murdered.

USAAF Station Units assigned to RAF Bodney were: 
 1st Service Group (VIII Air Force Service Command)

352nd Fighter Group

 328th Fighter Squadron
 486th Fighter Squadron
 487th Fighter Squadron

See also

 List of former Royal Air Force stations

References

Citations

Bibliography

 Freeman, Roger A. (1978) Airfields of the Eighth: Then and Now. After the Battle 
 Freeman, Roger A. (1991) The Mighty Eighth The Colour Record. Cassell & Co. 
 Maurer, Maurer (1983). Air Force Combat Units Of World War II. Maxwell AFB, Alabama: Office of Air Force History. .

 mighty8thaf.preller.us Bodney
 352d Fighter Group on www.littlefriends.co.uk
 USAAS-USAAC-USAAF-USAF Aircraft Serial Numbers--1908 to present

External links

 Photographs of RAF Bodney from the Geograph British Isles project
 The Wartime Memories Project - RAF Bodney
 352d Fighter Group website
 RAF Bodney photos taken in 2007
 RAF Bodney photo album

Airfields of the VIII Fighter Command in the United Kingdom
Royal Air Force stations in Norfolk
Royal Air Force stations of World War II in the United Kingdom
RAF Bodney